The third Annual American Music Awards were held on January 31, 1976.

Winners and nominees of 3rd Annual American Music Awards

1976
1976 music awards